Jean du Barry may refer to:

 (died 1560), organizer of the Amboise conspiracy
Jean-Baptiste du Barry (1723–1794), lover of Madame du Barry